"God Rest You Merry, Gentlemen" is an English traditional Christmas carol. It is in the Roxburghe Collection (iii. 452), and is listed as no. 394 in the Roud Folk Song Index. It is also known as "Tidings of Comfort and Joy", and by other variant incipits.

History

An early version of this carol is found in an anonymous manuscript, dating from the 1650s. It contains a slightly different version of the first line from that found in later texts, with the first line "Sit yow merry gentlemen" (also transcribed "Sit you merry gentlemen" and "Sit you merry gentlemen").

The earliest known printed edition of the carol is in a broadsheet dated to c. 1760. A precisely datable reference to the carol is found in the November 1764 edition of the Monthly Review.
Some sources claim that the carol dates as far back as the 16th century. Others date it later, to the eighteenth or early nineteenth centuries.

Although there is a second tune known as 'Cornish', in print by 1833 and referred to as "the usual version" in the 1928 Oxford Book of Carols, this version is seldom heard today. The better-known traditional English melody is in the minor mode; the earliest printed edition of the melody appears to be in a rondo arrangement for fortepiano by Samuel Wesley, which was already reviewed in 1815. Soon after, it appeared in a parody published in 1820 by William Hone. It had been associated with the carol since at least the mid-18th century, when it was recorded by James Nares in a hand-written manuscript under the title "The old Christmas Carol". Hone's version of the tune differs from the present melody in the third line: the full current melody was published by Chappell in 1855.

An article in the March 1824 issue of The Gentleman's Magazine complains that, in London, no Christmas carols are heard "excepting some croaking ballad-singer bawling out 'God rest you, merry gentlemen', or a like doggerel".
The carol is referred to in Charles Dickens' 1843 novella A Christmas Carol. It is also quoted in George Eliot's 1861 novel Silas Marner.

Lyrics
The following version of the first verse is found in a manuscript dating from the early 1650s:

A later version is found in Three New Christmas Carols, dated c. 1760. Its first verse reads:

The historic meaning of the phrase "God rest you merry" is 'may God grant you peace and happiness'; the Oxford English Dictionary records uses of this phrase from 1534 onwards. It appears in Shakespeare's 1599 play As You Like It. However, merry is often misinterpreted as an adjective modifying gentlemen. In Romeo and Juliet, the servant who inadvertently invites them to Capulet's masqued ball twice tells Romeo and Benvolio, "Rest you merry." The transitive use of the verb rest in the sense "to keep, cause to continue, to remain" is typical of 16th- to 17th-century language. Etymonline.com notes that the first line "often is mispunctuated" as "God rest you, merry gentlemen" because in contemporary language, rest has lost its use "with a predicate adjective following and qualifying the object" (Century Dictionary). This is the case already in the 1775 variant, and is also reflected by Dickens's replacement of the verb rest by bless in A Christmas Carol.

Some variants give the pronoun in the first line as ye instead of you, in a pseudo-archaism. In fact, ye would never have been correct, because ye is a subjective (nominative) pronoun only, never an objective (accusative) pronoun.

A variant text was printed in 1775 in The Beauties of the Magazines, and Other Periodical Works, Selected for a Series of Years. This text was reproduced from a song-sheet bought from a caroler in the street. This version is shown here alongside the version reported by W. B. Sandys (1833) and the version adopted by Carols for Choirs (OUP, 1961), which has become the de facto baseline reference in the UK.

Melody

Musical settings
Gustav Holst includes the carol in his 1910 choral fantasy Christmas Day.
The third movement of Victor Hely-Hutchinson's Carol Symphony (1927) is a scherzo on the tune of God Rest You Merry, Gentlemen.

Versions by popular music artists
 American country singer Garth Brooks (2000)
 American rock band Boston (2002), as "God Rest Ye Metal Gentlemen", released online and on a special tour edition of the album Life, Love & Hope.
 American contemporary Christian band MercyMe (2006)
 American smooth jazz gospel singer Tim Bowman (2010)
 The cast of Glee (2010)
 American metalcore band August Burns Red (2011)
 The Canadian band Barenaked Ladies and singer-songwriter Sarah McLachlan, on the 2004 album Barenaked for the Holidays
 American a-capella band Pentatonix, on the 2016 album A Pentatonix Christmas, and on  the soundtrack of the 2018 animated film adaptation of The Grinch
 Christian band Tenth Avenue North with Sarah Reeves (2016)

See also
 List of Christmas carols

References

Further reading
The New Oxford Book of Carols, ed. Hugh Keyte and Andrew Parrott (Oxford: Oxford University Press, 1992), p. 527

Christmas carols
18th-century hymns
Songs about Jesus